Uttar Pirpur is a census town in Uluberia II CD Block of Uluberia subdivision in Howrah district in the Indian state of West Bengal. It is a part of Kolkata Urban Agglomeration.

Geography

Demographics
As per 2011 Census of India Uttar Pirpur had a total population of 5,868 of which 3,049 (52%) were males and 2,819 (48%) were females. Population below 6 years was 839. The total number of literates in Uttar Pirpur was 3,987 (79.28% of the population over 6 years).

Uttar Pirpur was part of Kolkata Urban Agglomeration in 2011 census.

 India census, Uttar Pirpur had a population of 4789. Males constitute 52% of the population and females 48%. Uttar Pirpur has an average literacy rate of 63%, higher than the national average of 59.5%: male literacy is 69%, and female literacy is 58%. In Uttar Pirpur, 13% of the population is under 6 years of age.

References

Cities and towns in Howrah district
Neighbourhoods in Kolkata
Kolkata Metropolitan Area